The 21st World Cup season began in August 1986 in Argentina for men, resumed in late November, and concluded in March 1987 in Sarajevo.  The overall champions were Pirmin Zurbriggen and Maria Walliser, both of Switzerland, who each won for the second time.  Two-time women's overall World Cup champion Erika Hess of Switzerland retired at the end of the season.

Along with the elimination of the Combined discipline championship, all of the combined races on the schedule were eliminated except for the traditional two combineds at Wengen, Switzerland (the Lauberhorn) and Kitzbühel, Austria (the Hahnenkamm) for the men and one at Mellau, Austria for the women.  However, under new rules, points were only awarded to skiers who finished in the top 30 in each of the downhill and slalom; as a result, only two men earned points.  In addition, despite the presence of two tiebreakers, the ladies' Giant Slalom discipline ended in a tie.

A break in the schedule was for the 1987 World Championships, held in Crans-Montana, Switzerland, between January 27 and February 8, 1987.

Calendar

Men

Ladies

Men

Overall 

see complete table

In Men's Overall World Cup 1986/87 the best four downhills, the best four Super Gs, best four giant slaloms, best four slaloms and both combined count. 30 racers had a point deduction.

Downhill 

see complete table

Pirmin Zurbriggen won the cup with maximum points. Swiss athletes won 8 races out of 10.

Super G 

see complete table

In Men's Super G World Cup 1986/87 all five results count, but no athlete was able to collect points in all five races. Pirmin Zurbriggen won the cup with only one win.

Giant Slalom 

see complete table

In Men's Giant Slalom World Cup 1986/87 the best five results count. Zurbriggen and Gaspoz finished with the same number of points, but Zurbriggen was awarded the championship based on the victories tiebreaker (three wins to two).

Slalom 

see complete table

In Men's Slalom World Cup 1986/87 the best five results count.

Combined 
In Men's Combined World Cup 1986/87 both results count. Only two racers scored points (Wengen and Kitzbuhel). Points were only awarded to athletes, who were able to finish in both events (downhill and slalom) in top thirty.

Ladies

Overall 

see complete table

In Women's Overall World Cup 1986/87 the best four downhills, the best four Super Gs, best four giant slaloms, best four slaloms and the only combined count. 26 racers had a point deduction. Swiss athletes took the first five places.

Downhill 

see complete table

In Women's Downhill World Cup 1986/87 the best five results count.

Super G 

see complete table

In Women's Super G World Cup 1986/87 all five results count.

Giant Slalom 

see complete table

In Women's Giant Slalom World Cup 1986/87 the best five results count. Vreni Schneider and Maria Walliser tied in the last race at Sarajevo and each finished with 120 points and identical tiebreakers (each had four victories (first tiebreaker) and 15 points as the sixth result (second tiebreaker)). Thus, they also shared the Giant Slalom discipline trophy. As a consequence, the scoring procedures were changed for the next season to remove the limitation on the number of results that would count; all results would count beginning with the 1987/88 season.

Slalom 

see complete table

In Women's Slalom World Cup 1986/87 the best five results count.

Combined 

see complete table

In Women's Combined World Cup 1986/87 only one competition was held. Points were only awarded to athletes, who were able to finish in both events (downhill and slalom) in top thirty.

Nations Cup

Overall

Men

Ladies

References

External links
FIS-ski.com - World Cup standings - 1987

FIS Alpine Ski World Cup
World Cup
World Cup